Con O'Callaghan may refer to 
Con O'Callaghan (hurler), Irish hurler
Con O'Callaghan (decathlete) (1908–?), Irish Olympic decathlete
Con O'Callaghan (Gaelic footballer) Gaelic football player

See also
Cornelius O'Callaghan (disambiguation)
Conor O'Callaghan, Irish poet
Conor O'Callaghan (hurler), Irish hurler